Gaft (also Romanized as Gowft and Goft) is a village in Khavashod Rural District, Rud Ab District, Sabzevar County, Razavi Khorasan Province, Iran. At the 2006 census, its population was 34, in 9 families.

References 

Populated places in Sabzevar County